First International Bank & Trust (FIBT) started in 1910 as Farmers State Bank in Arnegard, North Dakota. In 1934 the bank moved its headquarters to Watford City, North Dakota, and changed the name to First International Bank. It is owned by Watford City Bancshares, Inc., which is owned by the Stenehjem family, and is a full service, independent community bank, a member of the FDIC, and an equal housing lender. First International Bank & Trust has 32 locations in North Dakota, South Dakota, Minnesota, and Arizona.

History
1910: Farmers State Bank established in Arnegard, ND.
1911: Odin Stenehjem becomes the first Farmers State Bank cashier.
1917: Gerhard Stenehjem becomes the first President.
1934: After relocating to Watford City, ND, First International Bank is born.
1936: O. Vincent Stenehjem starts his 50-year career as Vice President and cashier.
1949: Odin Stenehjem begins as President.
1965: Odin Stenehjem's son, Leland, steps in as President.
1984: The Stenehjem family acquires First National Bank of Fessenden, ND.
1990: First International Bank acquires Midwest Federal Savings & Loan offices in Williston, Killdeer, Minot, Harvey, and Fargo.
1992: Trust powers are added and the bank becomes First International Bank & Trust. Stephen Stenehjem, son of Leland, serves as President.
1993: First International Bank & Trust, NA, Fessenden merges with First International Bank & Trust.
1995: The Williston Economart office opens. Two offices in Scottsdale, AZ are acquired.
2000: A merger combines the two offices in Arizona with those in North Dakota.
2006: Farmers State Bank in Elgin, ND is acquired.
2007: New offices are acquired/opened in Staples and Motley, MN.
2008: New office is acquired/opened in Gilbert, AZ.
2010: First International Bank & Trust celebrates 100 years of banking.
2013: First International Bank & Trust expands with new locations in Minot and Williston, ND, Moorhead, MN, and Phoenix, AZ.
2014: First International Bank & Trust broke ground for a third location in Minot, ND.

Locations
Arizona
Chandler, AZ
Gilbert, AZ
Phoenix, AZ
Scottsdale, AZ

Minnesota
Edina, MN
Moorhead, MN
Motley, MN
Staples, MN

North Dakota
Alexander, ND
Bismarck, ND
Bowdon, ND
Elgin, ND
Fargo, ND
Fessenden, ND
Grand Forks, ND
Harvey, ND
Killdeer, ND
Mandan, ND
Minot, ND
Rugby, ND
Watford City, ND
West Fargo, ND
Williston, ND

South Dakota
Sioux Falls, SD

Products and services
Personal Banking
Checking
Savings
Loans
Mortgages
Credit Cards
Online Banking
Certificates of Deposit
IRAs

Business Banking
Checking
Loans
Credit Cards
Merchant Services
IRAs
EFT

Investment & Wealth Management
401(k) and Retirement Planning
Annuities
Mutual Funds
Stocks & Bonds
Estate Planning
College Funding
Personal Trust
Mineral & Land Services
Special Needs Trust

Insurance
Personal
Commercial
Agribusiness
Life & Health

Former names
Farmer's State Bank of Arnegard 1910–1933
First International Bank 1934–1991
First International Bank & Trust 1992–present

References

External links
 

Banks based in North Dakota